Hemaris saundersii, or Saunders' bee hawkmoth, is a moth of the family Sphingidae. The species was first described by Francis Walker in 1856. It is found from southern Kashmir, northern Pakistan, northern India (Himachal Pradesh) and north-eastern Afghanistan, eastwards along the Himalayan foothills of India (Punjab, Uttar Pradesh and Sikkim) to Bangladesh and northern Myanmar. The habitat consists of scrub-jungle at 1,800 to 3,000 metres altitude.

The wingspan is 50–60 mm. It is a diurnal species. Adults are on ing in June in Kashmir and from April to May and again in July in Himachal Pradesh.

The larvae feed on Lonicera quinquelocularis in India.

References

S
Moths of Asia
Moths described in 1856